= Gudamakeri =

- Village
- Country: India
- State: Karnataka
- District: Belgaum

Languages
  - Official: Kannada
- Time zone: UTC+5:30 (IST)

Gudamakeri is a village in Belgaum district in the southern state of Karnataka, India. Chikkodi taluka is the largest with an area of 1,995.70 km^{2} (770.54 sq mi) and Raybag taluka is the smallest with an area of 958.8 km^{2} (370.2 sq mi). The district comprises three revenue sub-divisions and six police sub-divisions. Apart from the Belgaum City Corporation, there are 17 municipalities, 20 towns, 485 gram panchayats, 1,138 inhabited villages and 26 non-inhabited villages. Belgaum is also the headquarters of the Belgaum Revenue Division.
